Guinea National Library and Archives refer collectively to two closely related institutions of the Republic of Guinea:
National Library of Guinea
National Archives of Guinea

Both institutions are located in Conakry and they have previously been collocated.

References